Pyridinium chloride is an organic chemical compound with a formula of C5H5NHCl.

Preparation 
Pyridinium chloride can be produced by passing hydrogen chloride in pyridine dissolved in diethyl ether. The chemical formula is as follows:

C5H5N + HCl -> C5H6N+Cl-  v

Acidity 
Containing a pyridinium ion, pyridinium chloride has a pKa of approximately 5, slightly more acidic than that of typical amines. This is due to the hybridization of the nitrogen: the nitrogen is sp2 hybridized and more electronegative than those nitrogens in ammonium cations, which are sp3 hybridized. Hence they are stronger acids than amines and can be more easily deprotonated by bases.

References 

Pyridinium compounds
Chlorides